Seiso Joel Mohai is a South African politician who is currently the Chief Whip of the Majority Party in the National Council of Provinces (NCOP). He was first elected to that position after the 2014 general election and he represents the African National Congress. He formerly served in both the National Assembly and the Free State Provincial Legislature, and he was a Member of the Free State Executive Council from 2004 to 2013.

Early life and activism 
In the early 1980s, Mohai attended secondary school in Botshabelo, a township outside Bloemfontein in the Orange Free State. While a student, he became active in anti-apartheid politics, including through the Congress of South African Students and South African Youth Congress. He also helped established the Garment and Allied Workers' Union among textiles workers in the region. After the African National Congress (ANC) was unbanned in 1990, he was recruited to the leadership of the ANC Youth League in the Southern Free State region around Botshabelo. He was elected to the Youth League's National Executive Committee in 1998.

Career in government 
Mohai represented the ANC during a brief stint in Parliament from 1999 to 2001 or 2002. Thereafter he returned to the Free State to serve as ANC Chief Whip in the Free State Provincial Legislature. He held the whip until the 2004 general election, after which he was appointed to the Free State Executive Council by Beatrice Marshoff, the newly elected Premier of the Free State; Marshoff made him Member of the Executive Council (MEC) for Public Works, Roads and Transport. After the next general election in 2009, he was appointed MEC for Finance by Marshoff's successor, Premier Ace Magashule. However, in March 2013, Magashule fired Mohai from the Executive Council, replacing him with Elzabe Rockman. He said that Mohai was a "very strong leader" and that the ANC had decided to "redeploy" him to the national Parliament.

Mohai rejoined the National Assembly on 26 March 2013, filling a casual vacancy. He served in that seat until the 2014 general election, when he was elected to the National Council of Provinces (NCOP), the upper house of the Parliament, and appointed the ANC's Chief Whip in the NCOP. He was re-elected both to his NCOP seat and to the whip's office after the 2019 general election. In January 2023, he was one of three candidates nominated by the ANC for election as Mayor of Mangaung.

References

External link 

 

Living people
Year of birth missing (living people)
African National Congress politicians
Members of the National Council of Provinces
Members of the Free State Provincial Legislature